The yellow tit, Taiwan yellow tit, or Formosan yellow tit (Machlolophus holsti) is a species of bird in the family Paridae.
It is endemic to central Taiwan.

Its natural habitat is montane temperate forest.

It has a restricted range and small population, and appears to be declining due to large-scale capture for export by the wild bird trade, so it is classed as Near Threatened by the IUCN.

The yellow tit was formerly one of the many species in the genus Parus but was moved to Machlolophus after a molecular phylogenetic analysis published in 2013 showed that the members of the new genus formed a distinct clade.

Its length is 13 cm. The yellow tit is mostly yellow, with a crest. The crest and back are blackish blue-grey.

References

yellow tit
Birds of Taiwan
yellow tit
yellow tit
Taxonomy articles created by Polbot